Grot may refer to:

People
Anton Grot (1884–1974), a Polish art director
Denis Grot (born 1984), Belarusian ice hockey player
Guillano Grot (born 1983), a Dutch footballer
Jan Grot, the bishop of Kraków from 1326 to 1347
Jay-Roy Grot (born 1998), a Dutch footballer
Philipp Grot Johann (1841–1892), a German illustrator
Sherwin Grot (born 1990), a Dutch footballer
Stefan Grot-Rowecki (1895–1944), or Grot, pseudonym of the Polish general and journalist Stefan Paweł Rowecki
Yakov Grot (1812–1893), 19th-century Russian philologist

Places
Grot (mountain), mountain in Serbia
Grotto, a shortened form. This use is chiefly literary
The Grot, a summer house in the grounds of Rydal Hall in England's Lake District

Transport
Grot-Rowecki, a freighter named after Stefan Rowecki, which collided with a tanker in the English Channel
PZL TS-16 Grot, a Polish warplane

Other
Grot, a fictional business in the British sitcom The Fall and Rise of Reginald Perrin
"Get Rid Of Them", a tactical voter campaign in the 1997 United Kingdom general election
Official name of MSBS rifle

See also
Grote (disambiguation)
Grotte (disambiguation)